Jack Shelley (1 August 1905 – 3 December 1979) was an  Australian rules footballer who played with St Kilda in the Victorian Football League (VFL).

Notes

External links 

1905 births
1979 deaths
Australian rules footballers from Victoria (Australia)
St Kilda Football Club players
People educated at Melbourne Grammar School